I Am the Portuguese Blues is the eighth full-length album released by Starflyer 59.  With this album, the band returned to its past in multiple ways.  The band's earlier albums had been characterized by loud guitars, but later albums saw the band progress to a softer sound, incorporating keyboards.  I Am the Portuguese Blues saw the return of the sound from earlier albums, as the band was stripped just to Jeff Cloud on bass, Frank Lenz on drums, and Jason Martin, the only person to perform on all of Starflyer 59's albums, handling guitar and vocal duties.  In addition, the album has a monochromatic cover, similar to those of Starflyer 59's first three albums (Silver, Gold, and Americana).  Many of the songs on I Am the Portuguese Blues were written years earlier as demos for an album to follow Americana.  They were eventually scrapped, as the band decided to take a different musical direction for The Fashion Focus.  The old demos were refined and combined with several new songs for I Am the Portuguese Blues. In regards to the title of the album, Martin, the band's frontman said, 
"I thought the title was odd. There are a couple of proper blues riffs‚ on there, but mainly it is just a rock and roll album – no tricks no gimmicks.... And, oh yeah, I'm Portuguese."

Track listing
All songs written by Jason Martin.

Personnel
Jason Martin – vocals, guitar, engineer, art direction
Jeff Cloud – bass guitar
Frank Lenz – drums
Aaron Sprinkle – mixing
Troy Glessner – mastering
Brandon Ebel – executive Producer
Kris McCaddon – art direction, design

References

Starflyer 59 albums
2004 albums
Tooth & Nail Records albums